Jambera is a town, and one of twenty union councils in Battagram District in the Khyber-Pakhtunkhwa province of Pakistan. It is situated on the bank of the river Indus and population of the union council is about 15,000. The union council of Jambera has three village councils: Jambera, Cheran, and Kund. Nawab Zada Abdul Ghafoor Khan is currently the Member of District Council from Union Council Jambera. Muhammad Ishaq is the member of this council currently.

References

Union councils of Battagram District
Populated places in Battagram District